Ann J. Chambers Land (March 12, 1932 in Philadelphia, Pennsylvania – March 9, 2010 in Sea Isle City, New Jersey) was a member of the Philadelphia City Council and a member of the Democratic Party.

Early life
Land was a native of North Philadelphia, where she attended John W. Hallahan Catholic Girls High School. After graduating from high school in 1950, she was an office worker, and later became a librarian at the Pennsylvania Senate.

Political involvement
She was an active campaigner for John F. Kennedy, and later became a member of the Philadelphia's Democratic Committee. In the late 1970s, she was elected leader of the 38th Ward.

City council
In 1980, she won a special election to the Philadelphia City Council, after incumbent George Schwartz resigned in the wake of the Abscam scandal. She was re-elected 1983, and in 1987, she won a second full-term by defeating challenger Michael Nutter.

Defeat and later life
In 1991, Nutter again challenged Land, and this time was successful. Nutter would go on to wage a successful campaign for Mayor in 2007.

After her defeat, Land was a community-relations specialist with Philadelphia Gas Works.

Personal life
Land married her husband, John, in 1954. He was a beverage distributor with a business in West Philadelphia. The couple had five children.

She died of chronic obstructive pulmonary disease in March 2010 at her home in Sea Isle City, New Jersey.

References

1932 births
2010 deaths
People from Sea Isle City, New Jersey
Philadelphia City Council members
Pennsylvania Democrats
Women city councillors in Pennsylvania
21st-century American women